Beijerinckia is a free living nitrogen-fixing aerobic microbe. It has abundant of nitrogenase enzyme capable of nitrogen reduction.

Beijerinckia  is a genus of bacteria from the family of Beijerinckiaceae.

References

Beijerinckiaceae
Bacteria genera
Martinus Beijerinck